Verwood is a town and civil parish in eastern Dorset, England. The civil parish comprises the town of Verwood together with the extended village of Three Legged Cross, and has a population of 15,170 according to latest figures (2014) from Dorset County Council. Verwood is the largest town in Dorset without an upper school.

History

Early history
Verwood was originally recorded as Beau Bois (Norman French: "beautiful wood") in 1288, and it was not until 1329 that it got the name Verwood, which developed from Fairwood or The Fayrewood.

Verwood is recorded as "Fairwod" (1329) and as "Fayrwod" (1436); this name has the meaning "fair wood" and the modern form shows the change of initial "f" to "v" characteristic of many Southwestern English dialects.

Pottery industry
The East Dorset pottery industry, known collectively as Verwood Pottery, thrived from early times on the clay soils of the neighbourhood which had ample firing material close at hand. The major production was of domestic earthenware although finer and more unusual pieces have been found from earlier times. In the latter days ornamental and novelty items were produced.

Until the end of their useful life, the methods of production had not varied from Roman times, all the processes being carried out with no mechanisation or electrification. For example, the clay was always trodden by foot and not mixed in a pug mill. The wheel was turned by an assistant with a pole or handle, and the kilns were wood fired. For these reasons the Crossroads Pottery, then the last remaining in the area, attracted national and local newspaper attention in the early to mid 20th century.

The industry was not confined to a local sales base. Hawkers, or "higglers", took the wares for sale over a wide area of southern England. They were also exported abroad, especially to Newfoundland which had a thriving trade with the nearby port of Poole. Examples of Verwood pots can be seen at the Verwood Heathland Heritage Centre.

Remembrance of those that fell in war
The Verwood Memorial Recreation Ground is dedicated to those who fell in the Great War, and is owned by the Verwood Memorial Recreation Ground Trust. Members of the Verwood Town Council automatically become trustees.  The recreation ground land was purchased by public subscription in 1920 and the parish council was to hold the land to the benefit of the inhabitants of the parish of Verwood for use as a public recreation ground. The Recreation Ground comprises an area big enough for a football pitch and several children's play areas. It is across the road from the Memorial Stone, and had a set of wrought iron gates with a plaque on them saying "Verwood Recreation Ground / In memory of those that fell in the Great War 1914-1918". 

It is widely believed that the oak trees around the recreation ground were planted in remembrance of each person who fell in the first world war (one tree per person), however this could be apocryphal.  These trees each have tree preservation orders to protect them, regardless.

In 1955 a formal Committee of Trustees was set up with the intention of building a new village hall, to be called the “Memorial Hall” in remembrance of those locals who valiantly gave their lives in the second world war.  With the Recreation Ground being a memorial to those who fell in the first World War, it was agreed that the new hall should be constructed there.  The official opening of Verwood Memorial Hall took place on the 9th May 1959. The Memorial Hall was extended during the Queen’s Silver Jubilee year (1977).  The hall has come under threat on a number of occasions, each time public pressure resisting its demolition. 

The Memorial Stone is across the road from the Memorial Hall and the Memorial Recreation Ground.  Two plaques on the front of the stone are dedicated to the gallant souls who died in the first and second world wars

1980–present
Verwood's first supermarket opened in the 1980s. In 1985 the town was twinned with the French town Champtoceaux. In 1987 the population of Verwood reached 9,856. The Parish Council passed the necessary resolution to become a Town Council under provisions made in the 1972 Local Government Act. In 1992, the new Verwood Town Council offices were opened. Later that year, the town twinned with the German town Liederbach am Taunus. In 2001, the town reached a population of 12,069. Verwood Heritage Centre was opened by Rt. Hon. Viscount Cranborne. The centre is used as a museum of local history and a coffee shop. In 2007 the Verwood Hub, a multi-purpose cinema and theatre, opened to the public.

By 2014 the town had a population of over 15,000 and the Verwood Town Plan, published that year, identified a number of priorities including providing residents with new facilities, such as a swimming pool and an upper school.

Politics and Government
Verwood is a part of the North Dorset constituency represented in the House of Commons of the UK Parliament since 2015 by Simon Hoare, a Conservative. At the last election, his wikipedia page says he had a majority of 24,301 (43.3%).

There has been a Parish or Town Council in Verwood since 1894 when it had a population of only 1,190. 

Verwood Town Council, the elected body of the Town, consists of eighteen members representing the Civil Parish. There are four wards in the Civil Parish: Dewlands North Ward (two councillors), Dewlands South Ward (eight councillors), Stephen's Castle Ward (seven councillors) and Three Legged Cross Ward (one councillor).  As a Council they meet eight times a year at the Council Offices and three times a year at the Village Hall, Three Legged Cross.

The Council operates with three sub-committees which each report to the full Council; the Finance & General Purposes Committee, the Planning Consultative Committee and the Amenities Committee.

Verwood is a ward of Dorset Council, and (since the 2019 election) is represented by three County Councillors - Toni Coombs (Conservative), Spencer Flower (Conservative, Leader of the Council) and Simon Gibson (Conservative).

Shopping and facilities
A country market which is open from 10:00 to 11:30 is held each Friday in the Memorial Hall. The market sells locally produced seasonal vegetables and fruit, plants and cut flowers, homemade cakes and jams and craft items.

The town has a number of shopping areas: in the town centre, a Morrisons superstore at Pennine Way, LIDL and Co-op on Ringwood Road.  There are three pubs, the Albion, The Monmouth Ash and Swans. In addition there is a wine bar in the centre called Renoufs Cheese and Wine Bar.

Eating establishments include an Italian restaurant, Indian restaurant and takeaway, cafe, fish and chip shop, kebab shop, Costa Coffee and a Chinese take-away (also a bistro in The Hub, see below, a morning coffee shop in the Heritage Centre and an eating area in Morrisons).

Verwood is home to the Hub, a community facility which opened in April 2007. The Hub houses the 300 seat Merryfield Theatre, a 100-seat hall and a number of other smaller rooms. These facilities are used for films, plays, concerts and many other activities and the rooms can be hired by various organisations. In the centre of the Hub is a bistro area, surrounded by art displays and various exhibitions.

Media and culture
Verwood is proud to boast three thriving brass bands.  Verwood Concert Brass Principal Band, Verwood Town Band, and Verwood Community Band.  As at 2022, Verwood Concert Brass is in the championship section in the West of England Region under the baton of Kevin Smith. The band became West of England 4th Section champions in 2005 and 2006. This resulted in two trips to the National Brass Band Finals of Great Britain in Harrogate where they finished 6th and 7th respectively. In September 2008 the band were placed second at the 3rd section national finals after winning the area championship in March, and made another 'Finals' appearance in 2009 in the 2nd section. They perform in many concerts in the local area including several performances at the Hub.

Verwood holds an annual carnival  around the time of the Spring bank holiday.  A thriving carnival committee ensures that all organisations and individuals in and around Verwood are able to participate in the annual carnival parade, typically including floats from Verwood Guides, Verwood Hillside First School, Verwood Youth Club The Hive, and the Verwood Pantomime Society. There are also marching bands, fire engines, individual displays and much more.

Forest FM is a community radio station, broadcast from Verwood for listeners based in Dorset. It hosts Europe's longest-running Beatles themed radio show ('BeatlesandBeyond') on its regular schedules.

VerwoodToday is an interesting online local source of news 

Viewpoint Magazine has been established for over thirty-five years and has its roots in Verwood. In April 2011 the magazine expanded into West Moors, Ashley Heath and St Ives. Its circulation has the potential to reach over 35,000 readers.

Sports and recreation

Association Football
Verwood is home to Verwood Town F.C., a football club founded in 1920. They are based at Potterne Park  and are currently members of Wessex League Premier Division.

Rossgarth Youth Football Club  is one of the most successful clubs in the area and has several teams covering all age groups for boys and girls, up to adult level. Eddie Howe, the former AFC Bournemouth manager, is a former Rossgarth player.

Cricket
Verwood Cricket Club  has several teams in both Adult and Youth (Colt) leagues. Home games are played at Potterne Park.

Lawn Bowls
Verwood Bowling Club(green bowls) who play at Moorlands Road, have several men's and ladies' teams.

Rugby Union
Verwood is the home to  Verwood Rugby Club, a relatively young and ambitious rugby club founded in 1994. The club's pitch is located at Potterne Park. Verwood RUFC are currently members of Dorset & Wilts Division 3 South League.
Dorset Dockers Rugby Club   have two teams, playing Barbarian-style rugby

Gym

Verwood also hosts three large family events: Verwood Carnival traditionally takes place on Spring Bank Holiday Monday, the Rustic Fayre on August Bank Holiday Monday, and Flameburst on the last Saturday in October.

Stephen's Castle and Stephen's Stone
Stephens Castle is an Iron Age barrow set in a SSSI site (site of special scientific interest), to the North of Verwood and at the top of an old sand and gravel quarry.  It is a Scheduled Ancient Monument. The barrow was excavated by archaeologists in 1828, where human remains dating back to the Iron Age were found.

The Stephen Stone is now well hidden amongst pine trees, surrounded by boggy ground.  Located approximately 400m north-east from Stephen's Castle, legend has it that Stephen was a local tribal chief of great strength. He was supposed to have hurled the 'Stephen stone' half a mile into Ringwood Forest, no mean feat as the stone weighs around 3 tonnes. 
In 1220 Stephen's Stone was recorded as "LE HORESTONE" and there was a boundary point in this area so it could be a boundary stone.

The Stone is an ancient block of sandstone, placed in a seemingly random location deep in the woods.  It is not a native sandstone and no other such stones have been found in the area. This type of object is known as a 'monolith' - a single massive stone or rock placed as a monument.  Although it is now laying flat, it is thought to have originally stood upright so its height above the ground may have exceeded 10 feet.  This being so, it would be one of the largest stones of this type ever to have stood in Dorset.  The area is once meant to have been open heathland, with the view maybe extending as far as Hengistbury Head on the coast.

Lost for many years in the overgrown wilderness, only scattered references to the existence of such a stone were available.  In 1841, an author recounted a 561 year old testimony speaking of a large stone on the heathland of Verwood.  In 1993, a prominent sacred site investigator named Peter Knight lead a project to rediscover the stone.  The site was then cleared in 1994 to allow public access.

Records suggest that many years ago, the local inhabitants regarded the stone with a sort of superstitious reverence and told long tales about the impossibility of removing it.  There was meant to be a golden casket buried underneath the stone, and of a belief that "if anyone attempted to remove it, a black bird of dire omen perched upon its top to scare the miscreants."  Perhaps the 'golden casket' was in fact a metaphoric reference to powerful supernatural energies that may be accessible at this location.  For whatever reason, warnings may have evolved to inform people not to misuse the site.

Transport

Road 
The town effectively sits on the cross-roads of the B3081 and the B3072; connected to the A31 and A338 to the south-east via the B3081 and south to A31 at Ferndown via the B3072.

Public bus services
Public bus services are mainly provided by Wilts & Dorset serving Bournemouth and Poole. Services are also provided by Yellow Buses to Bournemouth and Poole College.

Rail
Verwood once had its own railway station, served by the Salisbury and Dorset Junction Railway. This was closed in 1964. The nearest stations to the town are: Christchurch 11.9 miles, Hinton Admiral 13.3 miles and Bournemouth 13.6 miles.

Education
Schooling in Verwood is based on the 3-tier system, although after first school and middle school pupils transfer to either Queen Elizabeth's School, Wimborne Minster or Ferndown Upper School.

There are 3 First schools, accommodating children aged from 4–9: Verwood CofE First, Hillside First and Trinity CofE First.

Emmanuel CofE Middle School takes children from the three First schools, at ages 9–13. The school is on the same campus as Verwood First School.

Plans to open an upper school in Verwood were discussed as part of the 2014 Verwood Town Plan.

Notable residents
Lee Camp – AFC Bournemouth player
Michael Giles – original drummer for King Crimson, had a home studio
Harold Gimblett - cricketer 
Gordon Haskell – pop music vocalist, songwriter and bassist
Eddie Howe – AFC Bournemouth former manager and former player
Lionel Jeffries – actor, writer and director
Darren Kenny – Paralympic cyclist
Jessie Matthews – actress, singer and dancer
Buster Merryfield – actor
Sean O'Driscoll – first team coach Oldham Athletic FC and former AFC Bournemouth football player and manager
Tony Pulis – Football manager and former AFC Bournemouth football player and manager
Matt Tubbs – footballer

Twin towns
 Champtoceaux  in the Maine-et-Loire département of France.
 Liederbach am Taunus in the Main-Taunus Kreis of Germany

References

External links

 Verwood Town Council
 Verwood history website - Gotham Brick & Tile Co Ltd

 
Towns in Dorset
Civil parishes in Dorset
East Dorset District